Alexander Karađorđević (11 October 1806 – 3 May 1885) was the prince of Serbia between 1842 and 1858 and a member of the House of Karađorđević.

Early life
The youngest son of Karageorge Petrović and Jelena Jovanović was born in Topola on 11 October 1806. He was educated in Khotin, Bessarabia (Russia), under the patronage of the Russian Tsar.

After the Sultan’s decree acknowledging the title of Prince Mihailo Obrenović at the end of 1839, the family returned to Serbia. Alexander joined the Headquarters of the Serbian Army, and was promoted to the rank of Lieutenant and appointed as adjutant to Prince Mihailo.

Prince of Serbia
After the political conflicts caused by disrespect of the so-called "Turkish constitution," and Miloš Obrenović's and then Mihailo Obrenović's abdications, Aleksandar Karađorđević was elected the Prince of Serbia at the National Assembly in Vračar, a municipality in modern Belgrade, on 14 September 1842. Having had his title acknowledged by Russia and Turkey, Prince Aleksandar started the reforms and founded a number of new institutions in order to improve the progress of the Serbian state. He implemented the code of civil rights, introduced the regular Army, built a cannon foundry, improved the existing schools and founded new ones, as well as established the National Library and National Museum.

It was Councillor Lazar Arsenijević Batalaka who, in 1845 introduced Ilija Garašanin to Prince Aleksandar.

During the Hungarian Revolution in Vojvodina, in 1848, Prince Aleksandar Karađorđević sent Serbian volunteers under the command of Stevan Knićanin to help the Serbs’ struggle for autonomy. As a follow-up of the national-political movements of 1848, the pan-slavistic idea of a Yugoslav Monarchy emerged. The "Načertanije" (the "Draft") document, written as a Serbian political program by Ilija Garašanin four years earlier, made the mission of replacing the Austrian and Turkish domination of all Southern Slavs with the Serbian rule under the banner of "Serbia."

Throughout his reign, Prince Alexander was troubled with Obrenović plots. By his refusal to take part in the Crimean War as an ally of the French, British and Ottoman Empires against the Russian Empire. The result was his overthrow and departure into exile in 1858 by the winners of the Powers in the war and bringing the rival Obrenović dynasty to the throne of the Principality of Serbia.

He was awarded the Ottoman Order of Glory and Order of Distinction.

Abdication
In internal policy Prince Aleksandar came into conflict with the members of the Council, which culminated in the convocation of the Saint Andrew's Day Assembly, in December 1858, which forced him to abdicate.

Prince Alexander died in Timișoara on 3 May 1885. He was buried in Vienna, and his earthly remains were moved in 1912 to the Memorial Church of St. George built by his son Petar I Karađorđević, in Oplenac, Serbia.

Marriage and issue 
On 1 June 1830 in Hotin, Bessarabia, he married Persida Nenadović (15 February 1813 – 29 March 1873), member of the powerful Nenadović family, daughter of Voivode Jevrem Nenadović (1793–1867) and Jovanka Milovanović (1792–1880). They had ten children:

Poleksija (1 February 1833 – 5 December 1914), married firstly in 1849  (1821 – murdered 13 October 1877), Serbian Minister of the Interior, by whom she had issue; secondly Dr Alexander Preshern (1830 – 2 December 1914).
 (26 November 1835 – 13 July 1855), married in 1855 Milan Avram Petronijević, Serbian Ambassador to Russia.
Aleksij (23 March 1836 – 21 April 1841)
Svetozar (1841 – 17 March 1847)
Petar (29 June 1844 – 16 August 1921) ruled Serbia from 1903 until 1918, and subsequently as King of the Kingdom of Serbs, Croats, and Slovenes until his death; married Princess Zorka of Montenegro, by whom he had issue.
Jelena (18 October 1846 – 26 July 1867); married Đorđe Simić (28 February 1843 – 11 October 1921), Prime Minister of Serbia.
Andrej (15 September 1848 – 12 July 1864)
Jelisaveta (born & died 1850)
Đorđe (11 October 1856 – 5 Jan 1889)
Arsenije (16 April 1859 – 1938), married in 1892, a Russian noblewoman, Princess and Countess Aurora Pavlovna Demidova. They were the parents of Prince Paul of Yugoslavia.

References

19th-century Serbian monarchs
19th-century Serbian nobility
1806 births
1885 deaths
Eastern Orthodox monarchs
People from Topola
Eastern Orthodox Christians from Serbia
Alexander
Burials at the Mausoleum of the Royal House of Karađorđević, Oplenac